The Production and Operations Management Society (POMS) is an international professional society for academics and practitioners with interests in production operations, operations management, and supply chain management. The society was established in 1989 by Kalyan Singhal, of Merrick School of Business at the University of Baltimore, in collaboration with three hundred professionals from the operations management field.

Since 1990, the POMS society has annually held national conferences focused on academic and practitioner research presentations in the operations management discipline. POMS also sponsors conferences held by its Colleges, joint conferences with the European operations management society EUROMA, and international conferences. The society maintains the website www.pomsmeetings.org as a current and historical repository of information about these conferences.

The current President of POMS is Chelliah Siskandarajah, who is the Hugh Roy Cullen Chair in Business Administration Information and Operations Management at Mays Business School, Texas A&M University.  The President-Elect is Zuojun (Max) Shen from University of California Berkeley. POMS also is guided by Board Members made up of three Past Presidents, several Vice Presidents (e.g., Education, Finance, Meetings, Member Activities, Colleges, Publications, Communications, Industry, Americas, Africa & Middle East, Europe, and Australasia), a Secretary, and several at-large Board Members. POMS is also led by a Director of Strategic Planning, an Executive Director, Associate Directors (Global Outreach, Information Technology Services), a Web Editor, and a Social Media Coordinator.

The mission of POMS is to create, extend, and disseminate knowledge in the field of production and operations management.

POMS activities

Publications 
Production and Operations Management (POM) is the flagship journal of the society. POM is a scientific peer-review journal that publishes research from areas covering operations management, supply chain management, and business analytics. The journal is published by Wiley. The editor-in-chief for the journal is Kalyan Singhal. Subodha Kumar is the deputy editor-in-chief. POM is included among several lists of top journals for the Operations Management and Supply Chain Management fields, including by the UT Dallas Top 100 Business School Research Rankings, the Financial Times list, and other lists. POM is included among the top eight operations management and supply chain management journals used to calculate The SCM Journal List, being considered as a primarily analytically-focused journal. 

POMS Chronicle is the official newsletter of the society and is published twice a year.

Conferences 
The annual POMS conference is generally held in the early May. The most recent conference (2019 POMS Annual Conference) was held in Washington D.C. It was attended by more than 1900 professionals from around the world. In addition to the Annual conferences, several international conferences are held every year around the world. In 2019, international conferences were held in Brighton (UK), Tianjin University (China), Mumbai (India), and Hong Kong.

Chapters 
POMS society has chapters in Beijing, India, Hong Kong, Latin America, Caribbean, and Taiwan.

Awards 
POMS recognizes scholars and practitioners from POM field by bestowing awards in various accomplishments. They include:

 POMS Fellows Award
 Martin K. Starr Excellence in Production and Operations Management Practice Award
 Sushil K. Gupta Distinguished POMS Service Award
 Paul Kleindorfer Award 
 Wickham Skinner Award
 Emerging Economies Doctoral Student Award
 Distinguished Lecturer Award

History 
The society was established in 1989 by Kalyan Singhal, of Merrick School of Business at the University of Baltimore, in collaboration with three hundred professionals from the operations management field.

Presidents 
Presidents of POMS have included:

 2021 Zuo-Jun 'Max' Shen
 2020 Chelliah Sriskandarajah
 2019 Nada Sanders
 2018 J. George Shanthikumar
 2017 Manoj Malhotra
 2016 Edward Anderson
 2015 Asoo J. Vakharia
 2014 Asoo J. Vakharia
 2013 Christopher S. Tang
 2012 Suresh Sethi
 2011 Luk Van Wassenhove
 2010 Marshall Fisher
 2009 Wally Hopp
 2008 Cheryl Gaimon
 2007 Jatinder 'Jeet' Gupta
 2006 Hau Lee
 2005 Kasra Ferdows
 2004 Gabriel Bitran
 2003 Aleda Roth
 2002 Aleda Roth
 2001 Robert Hayes
 2000 Robert Hayes
 1999 John Buzacott
 1998 Wickham Skinner
 1997 Roger Schmenner
 1996 Sushil Gupta
 1995 Martin Starr
 1994 Kalyan Singhal
 1993 Kalyan Singhal
 1992 Kalyan Singhal
 1991 Kalyan Singhal

Related professional societies
 Academy of Management
 Association for Supply Chain Management
 Institute for Operations Research and the Management Sciences
 Institute of Supply Management

References

External links 
 

Professional associations based in the United States